The Cuzco Warbler (Myiothlypis chrysogaster) is a South American species of bird in the family Parulidae. Its natural habitats are subtropical or tropical moist lowland forests, subtropical or tropical moist montane forests, and heavily degraded former forest. The bird was split from the golden-bellied warbler.

References

Myiothlypis
Birds of the Yungas
Birds described in 1844
Taxonomy articles created by Polbot